Last Slaughter is a 2006 Russian drama film directed by Sergey Bobrov.

Plot 
In the center of the plot are three miners of different generations who do not have enough money to feed their families, as a result of which they undermine themselves in the mine.

Cast 
 Sergey Garmash as Sergei Nikolayevich
 Nina Usatova as Galya
 Pyotr Zaychenko as Anatoli Ivanovich, 'Grandpa'
 Tatyana Shkrabak as 'Grandpa's wife
 Artur Smolyaninov as Andryukha
 Yuliya Snigir as Anzhela (as Yuliya Snigir)
 Aleksey Gorbunov as Yefim Ilyich
 Olga Khokhlova as Anzhela's mother
 Tatyana Lyutaeva
 Natalya Naumova
 Oksana Polovina

References

External links 
 

2006 films
2000s Russian-language films
Russian drama films
Films about mining
2006 drama films